Cyren Inc. was a cloud-based, Internet security technology company providing security as a service and threat intelligence services to businesses until it announced its collapse in February 2023. Cyren provided web security, DNS security, cloud sandboxing, inbound/outbound anti-spam services, real-time phishing detection and blocking, ransomware protection, URL filtering, IP reputation for email, malware attack detection, anti-malware and IP intelligence, botnet attack prevention, and cloud threat lookup. Cyren also provided endpoint protection, including anti-malware for mobile devices, URL filtering for mobile devices, and inbound/outbound Internet of Things (IoT) gateway protection. Major corporate clients using Cyren's services include Microsoft, Google, Check Point, Dell, T-Mobile, and Intel.

At it's peak, Cyren employed approximately 220 with headquarters in McLean, Virginia (US), and offices in Herzliya (Israel), Berlin (Germany), Bracknell (UK) and Reykjavík (Iceland). Its common stock was listed on the NASDAQ Stock Exchange under the ticker symbol CYRN. In January 2019, Cyren announced that it was voluntarily delisting from the Tel Aviv Stock Exchange.

Cyren was among the most well-funded cybersecurity firms in the Washington, D.C., metro area according to a 2018 study. In 2018 Cyren made news for its research into phishing trends, particularly the prevalence of Microsoft Office, Office365, and Outlook as the brands most targeted by phishing kits. In the same year, the firm provided primary support to the Icelandic police during their investigation of the largest cyberattack to hit the country.

The company estimated that its security cloud currently processes more than 25 billion security transactions generated by over 1.3 billion users in 180 countries to detect cyber threats as they emerge.

Company history
Commtouch was incorporated as a private company under the laws of the State of Israel on February 10, 1991, by Gideon Mantel, a former officer in a “special bomb-squad unit” for the Israel Defense Forces (IDF). Wired magazine observed that the early company culture at Commtouch encouraged “being a fighter” as their Israeli employees had completed several years of military service.

The Israeli venture capital company Gemini Israel Ventures which was supported by the "Yozma" government program at the time (doubling any investment with government money, see Yitzhak Rabin) made an investment in Commtouch.

In 1997, Isabel Maxwell became president of Commtouch. According to Maxwell, she convinced Microsoft co-founder Bill Gates to make an investment in the business. In 1999, Microsoft co-founder Paul Allen also made an investment in Commtouch of $20-million.

Commtouch went public in 1999.

In September 2010, the company acquired the Command Antivirus division of Authentium, and in October 2012, completed the acquisition of the antivirus business FRISK Software International.

In November 2012, it completed the acquisition of Eleven GmbH, which enabled the company to accelerate the delivery of private-label cloud-based security services, specifically designed for OEM and service provider markets.

In January 2014, it received shareholder approval to change its name from the original of “Commtouch” to Cyren Ltd.

On February 1, 2023, the company announced that, due to "current market conditions and associated challenges with raising additional capital, the Company approved a plan to reduce its workforce by approximately 121 employees, representing substantially all of the Company's workforce." This news followed the appointment in mid-January of Jeffrey Dauer as the Company's Chief Financial Officer and Chief Accounting Officer.

On February 22, 2023, the company announced that it had ceased operations and commenced insolvency proceedings to liquidate its subsidiaries.

On March 3, 2023, the company's shares were delisted from The Nasdaq Stock Market.

Technology
Cyren's cloud-based security services are delivered via two platforms: Cyren Cloud Security (CCS) and Threat Intelligence Services (TIS). The CCS SaaS security platform is designed for enterprises and sold either directly or through channel partners.  Services include Web Security, Email Security, DNS Security, and Cloud Sandboxing.  Cyren TIS offers cloud-based cyber threat detection application program interfaces (APIs), and software development kits (SDKs) to technology and security vendors, including Google and Microsoft. Cyren TIS services include Email Security, Web Security, Endpoint Security, and Advanced Threat Protection.  These platforms are powered by Cyren GlobalView™, Cyren's global security cloud that analyzes 25 billion security transactions each day to identify emerging threats in real time.

Recent announcements
In February 2019, Cyren announced the intent of Lior Samuelson, the chief executive officer and chairman of the board, to step down as CEO. On April 24, 2019, it was announced Brett Jackson would be taking on the role of CEO.

In January 2019, Cyren announced that it would be voluntarily delisting from the Tel Aviv Stock Exchange (TASE) io simplify regulatory filings and concentrate fragmented trading volume onto the Nasdaq exchange. The company's ordinary shares were delisted from trading on the TASE on April 10, 2019. Cyren will continue to maintain its headquarters in Herzliya, Israel, and operate as an Israeli-registered company.

In July 2017, the private equity firm Warburg-Pincus announced it had acquired a 21.3% stake in Cyren for $19.6 million.

Awards
In 2018 and 2019, Cyren Email Security received a first-place gold award in the email security category in the Cybersecurity Excellence Awards, and placed at the top in the anti-malware category in 2017.

See also
 Web Application Security
 Antivirus software
 Anti-spam techniques

References

Companies listed on the Nasdaq
Security companies of Israel
Technology companies established in 1990
Software companies of Israel
Companies based in Netanya
Companies listed on the Tel Aviv Stock Exchange